is a Japanese romantic comedy manga series by Alifred Yamamoto. It has been serialized online via Flex Comix's Comic Meteor website since 2016 and has been collected in thirteen tankōbon volumes. A four-episode live-action drama adaptation aired from September 1 to September 22, 2018, and a live-action film adaptation premiered on February 1, 2019. An anime television series adaptation by Zero-G aired from January to March 2020. A second season aired from April to June 2022.

Premise
Saitama University researchers Shinya Yukimura and Ayame Himuro use data science to analyze the world's systems. But when Ayame confesses to Shinya that she might be in love with him, they both agree that they need to approach the issue with scientific experiments including measuring their heart rates under various situations. Their quirky coworkers in their research group also join in on the fun.

Characters

 (season 1), Alejandro Saab (season 2-present) (anime)
Yukimura is a first-year graduate student who loves to analyze everything scientifically. He likes Himuro but is overcome by awkwardness whenever anything the situation gets intimate.

 (anime)
Ayame Himuro is a first-year graduate student who is as obsessed with science as Yukimura. She has long and light purple hair in the anime series. She is the one who initially confesses to Yukimura. Both of them are in the same wavelength when it comes to science, but when it is explicitly romance, Himuro is shown to be more aware of the moment. In the anime series, her ponytail sometimes sways like a dog's tail when she is happy.

 (anime)
Kanade is a fourth-year undergraduate student in the Ikeda lab group, and Yukimura and Himuro's junior. She fell in love with science because of her encouraging interactions with her high school math teacher, and also likes that her group is balanced between men and women. Being the straight girl in the group, she gets impatient that Himuro and Yukimura are not pursuing each other like a normal couple and are making that process way more complicated than it should be. She herself longs for a normal romance.

 (anime)
Ibarada is a second-year graduate student and the most senior of the students in Ikeda lab. She is petite and has long lavender hair in the anime series. She likes to occasionally tease her juniors, especially her childhood friend Kosuke. She spends much of her time playing heldheld video games and often naps on the lab's couch.

 
Kosuke is a fourth-year undergraduate student with blond hair. He seems to be an easy-going ladies' man on the outside, bragging about his long-term relationship with a girl named Aika, but it is soon revealed he is actually a hardcore otaku and that Aika is a dating sim character which he has merch including figurines and dakimakura (body pillows). He and Ibarada are childhood friends who share interests like video gaming.

 (anime)
Professor Ikeda Kashin is the supervisor of the lab. He is usually calm but can be intimidating sometimes. He has a muscular build and isn't afraid to crush pens in his hands when he gets emotional. He is also married.

 (anime) 
A bear mascot who explains certain complicated science details for the audience.

 Professor Ikeda's former student and an alumna of his lab. She aspires to be a professional manga artist and wants to use Yukimura and Himuro's relationship as reference material, even if it means sabotaging their relationship at times.

 A graduate student in biology at the university.  Her studies include research into aphrodisiacs.  Her flirtatious personality is in contrast to that of her long-time boyfriend Chris.

 A graduate student in biology who works in the same lab as his long-time girlfriend Fujiwara.  The love between them is remarkably strong, often leaving Himuro and Yukimura questioning their own relationship.

 A high school student and daughter of a professor at the university.  Her father's relentless belittling leads her to believe she's an idiot, but when Yukimura begins to tutor her part-time, she comes to realize her true potential.

Media

Manga
The manga has been serialized online via Flex Comix Comic Meteor website since 2016 and has been collected in thirteen tankōbon volumes as of June 2022.

TV drama
A 4-episode live-action drama adaptation aired from September 1 to September 22, 2018 to promote the live-action film. The drama was directed by Masatsugu Asahi.

Live-action film
A live-action film adaptation premiered on February 1, 2019. The film was directed by Masatsugu Asahi and Toshihiro Sato.

Anime
An anime television series adaptation was announced on January 8, 2019. The series was animated by Zero-G and directed by Tōru Kitahata, with Rintarō Ikeda credited for series composition. Ikeda and Michiko Yokote wrote the scripts, and Yūsuke Isouchi designed the characters. Hisakuni, Shouichiro Hirata, Kaoru Ōtsuka, Shūhei Takahashi, Takuma Sogi, and Yūko Takahashi composed the music. It aired from January 11, 2020 to March 28, 2020 on Tokyo MX, BS11, AT-X and UHB. Sora Amamiya (who voices Ayame Himuro) performed the series' opening theme song "PARADOX", while Akari Nanawo performed the series' ending theme song "Turing Love" with utaite Sou as guest vocals. Amazon Prime Video Japan released all 12 episodes of the series on January 11, 2020 JST. Crunchyroll simulcast the series with subtitles as well and has also released an English dub.

On October 17, 2020, a second season was announced during a special event held in Japan. Titled  it aired from April 2 to June 18, 2022, with the cast and staff reprising their roles. Sora Amamiya performed the opening theme song "Love-Evidence", while CHiCO with HoneyWorks and Mafumafu performed the ending theme song "Bibitto Love".

On May 18, 2021, it was announced Sentai Filmworks picked up the home video rights.

Episode list

Science Fell in Love, So I Tried to Prove It

Science Fell in Love, So I Tried to Prove It r=1-sinθ

Reception
The manga has over 600,000 copies in print.

Notes

References

External links
 Manga official website 
 Live-action official website 
 Anime official website 
 

2020s college television series
Anime series based on manga
Comic Meteor manga
Crunchyroll anime
Live-action films based on manga
Japanese romantic comedy films
Japanese webcomics
Manga adapted into films
Manga adapted into television series
Romantic comedy anime and manga
Sentai Filmworks
Shōnen manga
Television shows set in Saitama Prefecture
Webcomics in print
Works about mathematics
Zero-G (studio)